Skúli  or Skuli is an Icelandic masculine given name and may refer to:

Skúli Þórsteinsson, 11th century Icelandic poet and warrior
Skúli Sverrisson (born 1966), Icelandic bass player and composer, residing in New York City
Skuli Sigfusson (1870–1969), politician in Manitoba, Canada

See also
Skúlason, patronymic meaning "son of Skúli"

Masculine given names
Icelandic masculine given names